Odotope theory, also known as weak shape theory, is a theory of how olfactory receptors bind to odor molecules. The theory proposes that a combination of shape factors determine the coupling. The word itself is an analogy to epitopes.

See also 
Docking theory of olfaction
Vibration theory of olfaction

References 

 Mori, K. and Shepherd, GM. (1994). Emerging principles of molecular signal processing by mitral/tufted cells in the olfactory bulb. Semin Cell Biol 5-1:65-74.
 Burr, Chandler. The Emperor of Scent: A true story of perfume and obsession. Random House, New York: 2002.

Olfaction
Theories